Metopoceras delicata is a moth of the family Noctuidae first described by Otto Staudinger in 1898. It is found in the Arabian Peninsula, Iraq, Turkey, Israel, Jordan and Syria.

The wingspan is about 25 mm. Adults are on wing in April. There is one generation per year.

External links
species info

Metopoceras
Insects of Turkey
Moths of the Middle East